Ilan may refer to:

Organization
ILAN, Israeli umbrella organization for the treatment of disabled children

Given name
Ilan (name), a Hebrew/Israeli name
Ilan Bakhar, a retired Israeli footballer
Ilan Araújo Dall'Igna, a Brazilian footballer
Ilan Gilon, an Israeli politician
Ilan Halevi, a Jewish-Palestinian journalist and politician
Ilan Pappé, an Israeli historian and socialist
Ilan Ramon, an Israeli fighter pilot in the Israeli Air Force and first Israeli astronaut
Ilan Shalgi, an Israeli lawyer
Ilan Volkov, an Israeli orchestral conductor

Surname
Meir Bar-Ilan, Orthodox rabbi and leader of Religious Zionism
Menachem Ilan (born 1960), Israeli Olympic sport shooter
Uri Ilan, Israeli soldier who committed suicide in a Syrian prison

Places
Bar-Ilan University, a university in Ramat Gan, Israel
Neve Ilan, a moshav shitufi in central Israel, west of Jerusalem
Ilan (county) (Yilan), a county in Taiwan
Ilan (city) (Yilan), capital of the county of Ilan (Yilan) in Taiwan
Ilan, Fars, a village in Iran
Ilan, Qazvin, a village in Iran

See also 
 Yilan (disambiguation)
 Llan (disambiguation)
 Elan (disambiguation)
 Elaan (disambiguation)